The list of Olympic men's ice hockey players for Austria consists of 150 skaters and 18 goaltenders. Men's ice hockey tournaments have been staged at the Olympic Games since 1920 (it was introduced at the 1920 Summer Olympics, and was permanently added to the Winter Olympic Games in 1924). Austria has participated in thirteen tournaments, the first in 1928 and the most recent in 2014. Austria has hosted the Winter Olympics twice, in 1964 and 1976 Winter Olympics; both times Innsbruck served as the host city. Austria has never won a medal in ice hockey, with their highest finish being fifth in 1928.  

Eight players have played in three separate Olympics, while Sepp Puschnig has played in the most games, 19 across three tournaments. Puschnig is tied with Del St. John for most goals scored, with 9, while Saint John has the most career assists, 7, and points, 16. Puschnig is the only player who has been inducted into the International Ice Hockey Federation Hall of Fame, though Dieter Kalt Sr. has been inducted as a builder.

Key

Goaltenders

Skaters

Notes

References

 
 
 
 
 

Austria men's national ice hockey team
ice hockey
Austria
Austria